Ferocactus emoryi,  known commonly as Emory's barrel cactus, Coville's barrel cactus and traveler's friend, is a barrel cactus in the genus Ferocactus.

Description

It has 15 to 30 ribs with tubercles, especially in the juvenile stage. The spines are white to reddish. The central spine is very strong, 4–10 cm long, while the seven to twelve radial spines reach lengths of up to 6 cm. The large and funnel-shaped flowers are usually red or yellow, reach lengths of up to 7.5 centimeters and have a diameter of 5 to 7 centimeters. The fruit is ovoidal, about 5 cm long. The subspecies F.e. rectispinus has been found with center spines as much as ten inches (25 centimeters) in length  or even thirteen inches (32 centimeters) . These are the longest spines of any cactus.

Distribution
This species is found in nature in Mexico (Sonora, Sinaloa and Baja California Sur) and in the United States (Arizona).

Habitat

Subspecies
Ferocactus emoryi var. emoryiFerocactus emoryi var. rectispinus'' (Engelm.) N.P.Taylor

References

 Flora of North America Editorial Committee, e. 2003. Magnoliophyta: Caryophyllidae, part 1. In Fl. N. Amer.. Oxford University Press, New York.
 Tropicos: Ferocactus emoryi
 Cactiguide: Ferocactus emoryi
 The Plant List.org: Ferocactus emoryi
 Desert Tropicals: Ferocactus emoryi 
 Cactus-art.biz: Ferocactus emoryi

External link

emoryi
Cacti of Mexico
Cacti of the United States
Flora of the Sonoran Deserts
Flora of Arizona
Flora of Baja California Sur
Flora of Sonora
Flora of Sinaloa